The 2011 World Junior Table Tennis Championships were held in Manama, Bahrain, from 13 to 20 November 2011. It was organised by the Bahrain Table Tennis Association under the auspices and authority of the International Table Tennis Federation (ITTF).

Medal summary

Events

Medal table

See also

2011 World Table Tennis Championships

References

World Junior Table Tennis Championships
World Junior Table Tennis Championships
World Junior Table Tennis Championships
World Junior Table Tennis Championships
Table tennis in Bahrain
International sports competitions hosted by Bahrain
World Junior Table Tennis Championships